Ullath is one of 18 villages on the island of Saparua in the province of Maluku, Indonesia.  Ullath situated on the southeastern peninsula of Saparua along with Siri-sori Amalatu, Siri-sori Amapatti, and Ouw.  It is most known for its cloves, fish, and sago.  The current raja (or traditional village leader) is Abraham Nikijuluw.

Ullath consists of an area that is 6,8 km2, and has a total population of 1,478 people, which makes it the 10th largest village on the island.

Religion
The majority of the people living in Ullath are Protestant Christian and they are part of the Syaloom congregation of the Protestant Church of Maluku.

Ullath is one of the original villages on the island and it is well known for its detailed records of the history of Maluku in general, including the fact that Ullath was the first village on the island of Saparu to be evangelized back in 1630, and was later followed by the village Booi.

Family groups in Ullath
A unique feature in Ullath is the importance of the "soa" or "family group" which includes usually a community of several families.  Traditionally there are 6 "soa" in Ullath.

 Soa Italili, which includes:
Supusepa
Manuputty
Pattipeilohy
 Soa Hatulessy, which includes:
Siwabessy
 Lawalata
 Manuputty
 Maail
 Soa Putimahu, which includes:
 Toumahuw
Manukiley
Litaay
 Soa Rumaila, which includes:
 Telehala
Sapulette
Paais
 Johannes
Manuhuttu
 Soa Soulisa, which includes:
Toisuta
Ahuluhelu
 Soa Raja, which includes:
 Pical
 Matheos
 Parinussa
 Manuputty
 Latul

Notable people from Ullath
 Johannes Latuharhary (July 6, 1900 – November 8, 1959) – the first governor of the province of Maluku
 Gerrit A. Siwabessy (August 19, 1914 – November 11, 1982) – an Indonesian national hero
 Ellyas Pical – the first world boxing champion from Indonesia.

References

External links
 Natal Sedunia Ullath 2009
 Negeri Ullath
 Tradisi Adat Upu Latu
 Ullath, Dari Gunung Turun Ke Pantai

Populated places in Maluku (province)
Saparua